Heat Wave is an album by American jazz pianist Ahmad Jamal featuring performances recorded in 1966 and released on the Cadet label.

Track listing
 "Heat Wave" (Irving Berlin) – 3:35   
 "April in Paris" (Vernon Duke, E. Y. Harburg) – 3:23  
 "Allison" (Hale Smith) – 2:52   
 "Gloria" (Leon René) – 2:53   
 "St. Thomas" (Sonny Rollins) – 4:21  
 "Misty" (Erroll Garner, Johnny Burke) – 2:49  
 "Maybe September" (Ray Evans, Percy Faith, Jay Livingston) – 3:00    
 "The Fantastic Vehicle" (Joe Kennedy) – 4:15  
 "The Girl Next Door" (Ralph Blane, Hugh Martin) – 6:56

Personnel
Ahmad Jamal – piano
Jamil Nasser – bass
Frank Gant – drums

References 

Cadet Records albums
Ahmad Jamal albums
1966 albums